Achargaon is a union of Nandail Upazila, Mymensingh District, Bangladesh. About 27,000 people are living here.

References

Populated places in Mymensingh District